Marcus Christie (born 18 January 1991) is an Irish racing cyclist. He competed in the time trial at the 2021 UCI Road World Championships.

Major results
2008
 2nd Time trial, National Junior Road Championships
2009
 National Junior Road Championships
1st  Time trial
2nd Road race
2010
 2nd Time trial, National Under-23 Road Championships
 5th Time trial, National Road Championships
2013
 3rd Time trial, National Under-23 Road Championships
2014
 1st Stage 2 Tour of the North
2016
 1st Stage 3 Tour of Ulster
 6th Chrono Champenois
2017
 3rd Time trial, National Road Championships
2018
 2nd Time trial, National Road Championships
 7th Time trial, Commonwealth Games
2020
 4th Time trial, National Road Championships

References

External links
 

1991 births
Living people
Irish male cyclists
Sportspeople from Derry (city)
Commonwealth Games competitors for Northern Ireland
Cyclists at the 2014 Commonwealth Games
Cyclists at the 2018 Commonwealth Games